Ajijul  Haque is a Bangladeshi politician. In 1979, he was elected to parliament for the Bogra-8 district  as a Bangladesh Nationalist Party representative.

Career 
Azizul Haque was elected a Member of Parliament for the Bogra-8 constituency as a Bangladesh Nationalist Party candidate in the 1979 Bangladeshi general election.

References 

Living people
Year of birth missing (living people)
Bangladesh Nationalist Party politicians
2nd Jatiya Sangsad members